Zard Forever Best: 25th Anniversary is the fourth compilation album by Japanese pop band Zard. It was released on 10 February 2016 under B-Gram Records.

Background
The album was released on same day as Zard debut single Good-bye My Loneliness. This album includes 4 CDs of the biggest hits from their career such as Makenaide, Yureru Omoi or Kokoro wo Hiraite with total 52 tracks.

Each CD symbolizes nature season such as spring (CD1), early summer (CD2), later summer (C3) and autumn-winter (CD4). This album was released to promote Zard's 25th anniversary debut. In 2017 they were released as individual CDs with different color title.

All the songs went through digital remastering with new original release on Blu-spec CD format. First press edition included booklet of Zard's photos and special QR code where fans could see making and preparation of their first live performance on ship Zard Cruising & Live.

Three types of commercials had been aired: with female, male voice and Conan's (Minami Takayama)'s voice actor and later uploaded on their official YouTube channel.

Charting
The album reached daily #1 and weekly #4 rank in first week. It charted for 224 weeks and sold more than 237,000 copies so far. The album received Golden award as well.

Track listing
All music has been written by Izumi Sakai.

Disc 1 (Spring)

Disc 2 (Early Summer)

Disc 3 (Later Summer)

Disc 4 (Autumn Winter)

Usage in media
My Friend: 4th ending theme for Anime television series Slam Dunk
Unmei no Roulette Mawashite: opening theme for Anime television series Detective Conan
Hoshi no Kagayaki yo: opening theme for Anime television series Detective Conan
Shoujo no Koro ni Modotta Mitai: theme song for anime movie Detective Conan: The Fourteenth Target
Don't You See!: ending theme for Anime television series Dragon Ball GT
Kono Ai ni Oyogi Tsukaretemo: opening theme for drama "Ai to Giwaku no Suspense"
Good-bye My Loneliness: theme song for drama "Kekkon no Risou to Genjitsu"
Kimi ni Aitakunattara...: theme song for drama "Risou no Kekkon"
Iki mo Dekinai: opening theme for Anime television series Chūka Ichiban!
High Heel Nugi Sutete: ending theme for Fuji TV program "Oi oi Tokyo Taste Rooms"
Ashita wo Yume Mite: ending theme for Anime television series Detective Conan
Glorious Mind: opening theme for Anime television series Detective Conan
Tsubasa wo Hirogete: theme song for anime movie Detective Conan: Full Score of Fear
Ai wa Kurayami no Naka de feat. Aya Kamiki ver.: opening theme for anime Detective Conan
Natsu wo Matsu Sail no You ni: theme song for anime movie Detective Conan: Strategy Above the Depths
Kimi ga Inai: theme song for drama "Kanojo na Kiraina Kanojo"
Kakegae no Nai Mono: theme song for Tokyo Broadcasting System Television program "Koisuru Hamikami!"
Today is another day: theme song for Anime television series Yawara!
Nemurenai Yoru wo Daite: ending theme for TV Asahi program "Tonight"

References

Zard albums
2016 compilation albums
Being Inc. compilation albums
Japanese-language compilation albums
Compilation albums published posthumously
Albums produced by Daiko Nagato